Lonely Boy may refer to:

Music
"Lonely Boy" (Paul Anka song), 1959
"Lonely Boy" (Andrew Gold song), 1977
"Lonely Boy" (The Black Keys song), 2011
"Lonely Boy", a 1963 song by Larry Norman on the album Home at Last
"Lonely Boy", a 1979 song by the Sex Pistols on the album The Great Rock 'n' Roll Swindle

Other uses
Lonely Boy (film), a National Film Board of Canada documentary about Paul Anka
Lonely Boy (2013 film), an American comedy-drama with Mackenzie Astin
Lonely Boy, a name given to Dan Humphrey in the Gossip Girl television and novel series